Bradina (Serbian Cyrillic: Брадина) is a village in the municipality of Konjic in Herzegovina, Federation of Bosnia and Herzegovina, Bosnia and Herzegovina.

Population
{| border="1" cellpadding="7" cellspacing="0" style="margin: 10px 0 10px 25px; background: #f9f9f9; border: 1px #AAA solid; border-collapse: collapse; font-size: 85%; float: center;"
|- style="background: #E9E9E9"
|colspan ="7" | Bradina
|-
|style="background: bgcolor="#F5DEB3" | Census year|style="background: bgcolor="#C2B280" | 1971 
|style="background: bgcolor="#C2B280" | 1981 
|style="background: bgcolor="#C2B280" | 1991 
|style="background: bgcolor="#C2B280" | 2013 
 |-
|Serbs|724 (87.65%)
|620 (88.57%)
|603 (90.67%) 
|3 (4.2%) 
|-
|Croats|64 (7.74%)
|44 (6.28%)
|32 (4.81%)
|3 (4.2%) 
|-
|Bosniaks|36 (4.35%)
|14 (2.00%)
|16 (2.40%)
|66 (91.7%)  
|-
|Yugoslavs|0
|22 (3.14%)
|12 (1.80%)
|-
|others|2 (0.24%)
|0
|2 (0.30%)
|-
|style="background: bgcolor="#F5DEB3" |Total
|826
|700
|665
|72
|}

Notable persons from Bradina
Ante Pavelić, founder of the organization Ustashe and leader of the World War II Independent State of Croatia

See also 
 Bradina massacre

References

Sources
 Nacionalni sastav stanovništva - Rezultati za Republiku po opštinama i naseljenim mjestima 1991., statistički bilten br. 234, Izdanje Državnog zavoda za statistiku Republike Bosne i Hercegovine, Sarajevo. (''"Ethnic composition of the population - results, by municipalities and settlements in 1991, Statistical Bulletin no. 234, Issue of the Central Bureau of Statistics of Bosnia and Herzegovina, Sarajevo.
 List of the local communities

External links
 Satellite image

Populated places in Konjic